Dov "Dovaleh" Glickman (born December 22, 1949) is an Israeli film, television and theatre actor.

Biography
Dov Glickman was born in Tel Aviv, Israel, to a secular Jewish family. His Russian Jewish parents Shlomo and Dvora immigrated to the Land of Israel in the 1920s. He began his career at the Israel Defense Forces's Naval Entertainment troupe. During the early 1970s he was a member of the Haifa Theatre company, where he played a variety of roles.

Acting career
In 1977, he made his first film appearance in Judd Ne'eman's Paratroopers.
For a period of twenty years between 1978 - 1998, Glickman starred, alongside Moni Moshonov, Shlomo Baraba and Gidi Gov in Israel's longest running television show, the weekly satirical  show Zehu Ze!. In 1995, he starred in Ephraim Kishon's TV comedy Sipurey Efraim. In 2013, he played in the internationally acclaimed film Big Bad Wolves for which he won the Best Actor award at the Fantasporto festival. During the years, he appeared in numerous notable theatre productions, as well as films.

In 2013, he was cast in a lead role of TV drama Shtisel, as the somber, wry, and charismatic Rabbi Shulem Shtisel, for which he won The Israeli Academy Award for Best Actor in a leading role, twice.

During the 1990s, he revived his Zehu-Ze character, Shaul, the flower salesmen in a Yellow Pages ad campaign, where he coined the term "wa-wa-wi-wa" later used by Sacha Baron Cohen.
The campaign went on to become a TV series in 2002, written and created by Glickman.

In 2016, he played the minister of commerce in Josef Cedar's Norman: The Moderate Rise and Tragic Fall of a New York Fixer. 
In 2018 he played a holocaust survivor in the Austrian film:"Murer: Anatomie eines Prozesses", in the critically acclaimed mini-series "Stockholm", in Yankul Goldwasser's film "Laces" for which he won the Israeli Academy award for best actor in a supporting role, and in Yonathan Indurski's and Ori Alon series "The Conductor" opposite Lior Ashkenazi.  
Since 2016, he had been starring in the theatrical political comedy "Angina Pectoris", written by Michal Aharoni, in the leading role.

In 2018/2019 he played Etgar in Burkhard C. Kosminski's highly acclaimed production of "Vögel" by Wajdi Mouawad at Schauspielhaus Stuttgart.

See also
Israeli television
Israeli cinema
Theater of Israel

References

External links

1949 births
Living people
Israeli male film actors
Israeli male stage actors
Israeli male television actors
Male actors from Tel Aviv
Israeli military musicians
20th-century Israeli male actors
21st-century Israeli male actors
Israeli people of Russian-Jewish descent
Israeli Ashkenazi Jews
20th-century Israeli Jews
21st-century Israeli Jews